Holoparamecus caularum is a species of handsome fungus beetle in the family Endomychidae. It is found in Europe and Northern Asia (excluding China) and North America.

References

Further reading

External links

 

Endomychidae
Articles created by Qbugbot
Beetles described in 1843